Tulsi Lahiri (7 April 1897 – 22 June 1959) was a Bengali actor, director and play writer.

Early life
Lahiri was born in 1897 in a zamindar family of Naldanga village, Rangpur of British India. He passed B.A and B.L and started his lawyer career in Rangpur court. While he came to Alipore Kolkata, Ustad Jamiruddin Khan recorded two of his songs and inspired Lahiri joined in His Master's Voice company as music director.

Career
Lahiri acted on stage and in number of films as actor, vocalist and instrumentalist. He performed initially in silent films then worked in more than 50 movies. He became popular after releasing his play Duhkhir Iman and Chhenra Taar which were successfully run in Bengal. He made an orchestra which was often used in stage dances. In 1933 he directed two films namely Jamuna Puliney and Radha Krishna.

Plays 

 Mahasampad
 Chorabali
 Dukhir Iman
 Vitti
 Chenra Taar
 Natyakar
 Nayak
 Churayyananda
 Banglar Mati
 Thikadar

Partial filmography
 Mriter Martye Agaman
 Sagar Sangamey
 Manmoyee Girls' School
 Parash Pathar
 Baksiddha
 Saheb Bibi Golam
 Sagar Sangamey
 Parabhritika
 Pathik
 Digbhranta
 Bamuner Meye
 Ramprasad
 Tumi Aar Aami
 Jiban Sangini
 Abatar
 Rikta
 Bangalee
 Radha Krishna
 Sonar Sansar
 Matri Sneha

References

External links
 

1897 births
1959 deaths
Bengali male actors
Male actors in Bengali cinema
20th-century Indian male actors
20th-century Indian dramatists and playwrights
Male actors from Kolkata
Bengali film directors
Film directors from Kolkata
20th-century Indian film directors

Dramatists and playwrights from West Bengal